Border Brigands is a 1935 American Western film directed by Nick Grinde and written by Stuart Anthony. The film stars Buck Jones, Lona Andre, Fred Kohler, Frank Rice, Hank Bell and Edward Keane. The film was released on June 1, 1935, by Universal Pictures.

Plot

Cast 
Buck Jones as Sergeant Buck Barry
Lona Andre as Diane
Fred Kohler as Captain Conyda
Frank Rice as Rocky O'Leary
Hank Bell as Henchman Sisk
Edward Keane as Inspector Jim Barry
J. P. McGowan as Inspector Winston 
Gertrude Astor as Big Six 
Silver as Buck's Horse

References

External links 
 

1935 films
1930s English-language films
American Western (genre) films
1935 Western (genre) films
Universal Pictures films
Films directed by Nick Grinde
American black-and-white films
1930s American films